Lysias was a city and episcopal see in the Roman province of Phrygia Salutaris I and is now a titular see.

History 
The city of Lysias is mentioned by Strabo, XII, 576, Pliny, V, 29, Ptolemy, V, 2, 23, Hierocles, and the Notitiae Episcopatuum. It was probably founded by Antiochus III the Great about 200 BC.

Some of its coins are still extant.

Lequien (Oriens christianus, I, 845) names three bishops of Lysias, suffragans of Synnada:
Theagenes, present at the Council of Sardica, 344
Philip, at Chalcedon 451
Constantine, at Constantinople, 879

Location 
Ruins of Lysias exist between the villages of Oinan and Aresli in the plain of Oinan, a little northeast of Lake Eğirdir.

References 

Catholic titular sees in Asia
Defunct dioceses of the Ecumenical Patriarchate of Constantinople
Geography of Phrygia
Archaeological sites in Turkey